Halimodendron is a monotypic genus of legume containing the single species Halimodendron halodendron, which is known by several common names, including common salt tree and Russian salt tree. It is closely related to the genus Caragana. It is native to Russia and southern Asia, but it can be found on other continents where it is an introduced species, and one that is often a noxious weed. This is a deciduous spiny shrub sprawling to a few meters in maximum width and up to three meters tall. Stems branch from the base and bear clusters of about four leaflets on sharp spurs. The ends of branches narrow to spines. Flowers also appear at the ends of spurs in clusters of two to four pink pealike blossoms each one to two centimeters wide. The fruit is a black woody inflated pod about 2 centimeters long containing legume seeds. The plant has a deep and wide root system, with the lateral roots sending up new shoots. In this manner the plant forms extensive thickets. When introduced to an area of suitable climate, such as California where it is a known weed, it can invade cultivated land and spread relatively quickly. It is tolerant of saline soils.

References

External links
Jepson Manual Treatment
USDA Plants Profile
California Dept. of Food and Agriculture Weed Profile
Photo gallery

Hedysareae
Monotypic Fabaceae genera